Pitcairnia micheliana is a plant species in the genus Pitcairnia. This species is endemic to Mexico.

References

micheliana
Flora of Mexico
Taxa named by Henry Cranke Andrews